XML Information Set (XML Infoset) is a W3C specification describing an abstract data model of an XML document in terms of a set of information items. The definitions in the XML Information Set specification are meant to be used in other specifications that need to refer to the information in a well-formed XML document.

An XML document has an information set if it is well-formed and satisfies the namespace constraints. There is no requirement for an XML document to be valid in order to have an information set.

An information set can contain up to eleven different types of information items:
The Document Information Item (always present)
Element Information Items
Attribute Information Items
Processing Instruction Information Items
Unexpanded Entity Reference Information Items
Character Information Items
Comment Information Items
The Document Type Declaration Information Item
Unparsed Entity Information Items
Notation Information Items
Namespace Information Items

XML was initially developed without a formal definition of its infoset. This was only formalised by later work beginning in 1999, first published as a separate W3C Working Draft at the end of December that year.
Infoset recommendation Second Edition was adopted on 4 February, 2004. If a 2.0 version of the XML standard is ever published, it is likely that this would absorb the Infoset recommendation as an integral part of that standard.

Infoset augmentation

Infoset augmentation or infoset modification refers to the process of modifying the infoset during schema validation, for example by adding default attributes.  The augmented infoset is called the post-schema-validation infoset, or PSVI.

Infoset augmentation is somewhat controversial, with claims that it is a violation of modularity and tends to cause interoperability problems, since applications get different information depending on whether or not validation has been performed.

Infoset augmentation is supported by XML Schema but not RELAX NG.

Serialization
Typically, XML Information Set is serialized as XML. There are also serialization formats for Binary XML, CSV, and JSON.

See also
XML Information Set instances:
 Document Object Model
 Xpath data model
 SXML

References

External links
 

World Wide Web Consortium standards
XML-based standards

ja:Extensible Markup Language#XMLインフォメーションセット